The three-finger salute (or three fingers,, commonly known as the Serbian salute, is a salute which originally expressed the Holy Trinity, used in oath-taking, and a symbol of Serbian Orthodoxy, that today simply is an expression, a gesture, for ethnic Serbs and Serbia, made by extending the thumb, index, and middle fingers of one or both hands.

The salute usually goes along with the Serbian flag, using several semantic layers to depict its historical meaning, while also being used a symbol of Serbian ethno-nationalism during the Guča Trumpet Festival. According to political scientist Anamaria Dutceac Segesten, "the salute remains a distinctive sign for the ethnic Serb and a symbol for belonging to the Serbian nation".

Origin

Orthodox symbolism

In Serbian and Orthodox tradition, the number three is exceptionally important. Three fingers are used when signing the cross in Orthodoxy, symbolizing the Trinity. The Serbs, when swearing Oath, historically used the three fingers (collected, as when crossing) along with the greetings "My Holy Trinity" (Serbian: Светог ми Тројства / Svetog mi Trojstva) or "for the Honorable Cross and Golden Freedom" (за крст часни и слободу златну / za krst časni i slobodu zlatnu) during formal and religious events. The salute was often made with both hands, raised above the head. Serbian peasants sealed a pledge by raising three fingers to the face, the face being "the focus of honour" in Balkan culture. A Serbian proverb goes "There is no cross without three fingers" (нема крста без три прста / nema krsta bez tri prsta). Karađorđe was appointed leader of the Serbian rebels after they all raised their "three fingers in the air" and thereby swore Oath. 
 
The three fingers were viewed as a symbol of Serbdom in the 19th century. Njegoš mentioned "the crossing with three fingers has not remained" when speaking of the Islamization of Serbs, a central theme in The Mountain Wreath (1847). Paja Jovanović's painting, The Takovo Uprising (1888), depicts Miloš Obrenović holding a war flag and saluting with three fingers. The Serb-Catholic movement in Dubrovnik, which supported that Serbs had three faiths (Orthodoxy, Catholicism and Islam), criticized the Pan-Serbists who according to them only "truly believed those Serbs, who cross with three fingers". A short story published in 1901 surrounds a Serbian despot meeting with a Szilágyi, who has the despot's three fingers cut off by Franciscan friars after discussing the right way of crossing.

Serbian Metropolitan Nikolaj Velimirović (1881–1956) called for a Serbian salute in which three fingers were to be raised along the greeting: "Thus Help Us God!". In 1937, Velimirović began a sermon protesting the Catholic support for separation of state and religion in Yugoslavia with "Raise three fingers, Orthodox Serbs!".

During World War II, the Catholic church in Independent State of Croatia sought that the Serbs renounce crossing with three fingers. A letter from the Chetniks to the Yugoslav Partisans stressed that the real government was in London (in exile) and that they would kill all who did not cross themselves with three fingers. An Ustashe song went Nesta krsta sa tri prsta ("Gone is the crossing with three fingers") which was referred to Muslim daily ablution and the Orthodox way of making the sign of the cross.

Modern form
Vuk Drašković, the leader of the Serbian Renewal Movement political party, said in a 2007 interview that he first used it in 1990 at the founding meeting of the party, inspired by Paja Jovanović's painting. During the March 1991 street demonstrations in Belgrade, the three fingers were massively used by Drašković's supporters, representing the three demands that the Serbian Renewal Movement had put before the government.

Usage and Controversy

Usage in sports 

 

In a famous photograph of the Red Star Belgrade team celebrating their victory at the 1990–91 European Cup, eight players are seen using the Serb salute, while a Croatian player, Robert Prosinečki, is not.

After winning the 1995 European basketball championship, the entire then-Yugoslav team displayed the three fingers. Aleksandar Đorđević says he flashed the three fingers "not to be provocative. Just: that's Serbia, that's us, that's me – nothing else. It's my pride." Serbian tennis player Novak Djokovic raises three fingers after his victories.

In 2001, Australian football team Perth Glory's Bobby Despotovski (of Serbian parentage) was sanctioned by the Australian Soccer Federation for giving the salute to the predominantly Croatian-community crowd at a Melbourne Knights home game and inciting a fight; Despotovski and coach Bernd Stange were subsequently assaulted by Knights fans, forcing the next fixture between the sides to be moved to Launceston.

Serbian water polo player Aleksandar Šapić said in 2007 that "I know that it was used by soldiers in war, but I do not raise three fingers because I hate someone. I respect all peoples, and know what is in my heart."

The salute was met with controversy in Turkey after Duško Tošić, playing for Beşiktaş, used the salute after Serbia won over Albania in the guest match in the UEFA 2016 qualifiers; Beşiktaş fans threatened him through Turkish media.

There have been instances in the former Yugoslavia where supporters paradoxically borrow symbols and slogans from the other ethnic groups: in May 2003, Bosnian Croat club Široki Brijeg fans, during a match against Bosniak FK Željezničar Sarajevo, chanted "kill the Turk" and raised the three-finger salute.

In the 2022 World Cup, FIFA opened a disciplinary case against Croatian fans following their taunting of the Canadian goalkeeper, Milan Borjan. Fans chanted 'Borjan is an Ustaše', referring to the pro-Nazi regime which exterminated Serbs, gypsies and Jews in Croatia and Bosnia in World War 2.

Borjan was born in an ethnic Serb region of Croatia that was part of the conflict that split the former Yugoslavia in the 1990s. In response to the taunting, he showed the three finger salute.

Modern-day usage
2007 Eurovision winner Marija Šerifović used the salute when celebrating points; controversially, she used the salute when receiving the maximum of 12 points from Bosnian viewers, after which Bosnian media reported it as being used as a direct provocation. The Swedish-Serbian National Association called it 'ridiculous', saying that the salute is not to be mistaken in that way, but viewed of as nothing more than 'a modified V sign', even though the three finger salute is older than the V sign.

According to political scientist Anamaria Dutceac Segeste, the significance of the salute is diverse: although it has been used by nationalists, it cannot be monopolized as such; it has been used without aggressive nationalist connotations, i.e. at sport events, by opponents of Milošević, by President Boris Tadić during the 2008 Summer Olympics, etc.
The salute is used by members and supporters of almost all Serbian political parties on their rallies during election campaigns. It can be seen at all kinds of street demonstrations and celebrations.

Croats, Bosniaks, and Kosovar Albanians, who have been at war with Serbs in the past, find the salute provocative. 

A 1998 Serbian daily newspaper Politika published an article that spoke of the "perennial demonization" of the salute, "which had already entered the catalogue of planitarian gestures", together with the closed fist, outstretched palm and V sign.

Yugoslav wars
During the Yugoslav wars, the salute was widely used as a Serb symbol. In the prelude of the Bosnian War, Bosnian Serbs were encouraged to vote in the 1991 referendum through posters which displayed the three fingers. During the wars, Serb soldiers raised the three fingers as a sign of victory.

When Russian peacekeeping troops entered Sarajevo in 1994, they used the salute when greeting the Serb troops, and because of this, they were branded pro-Serb; the UNPROFOR used the Serb salute when greeting the Serbs, and the V sign when greeting the Bosniaks, showing impartiality.

In 2006, the United Nations published the case titled IT-00-39-T from the International Tribunal for the Prosecution of Persons
Responsible for Serious Violations of International Humanitarian Law Committed in the Territory of the Former Yugoslavia since 1991, describing several atrocities committed by Serb military and police forces on Bosniak and Croatian civilians on 20 July 1992, in the villages Keratem, Omarska and Trnopolje. Detaines were executed, humiliated, and were forced to spit on the Bosnian flag and do the three-finger sign.

There were instances when non-Serb captives were forced to use the salute. According to a BBC documentary about the Srebrenica massacre, published by Human Rights Watch on 16 August 1995, Bosnian Serb forces transported Bosnian civilians in busses to the village of Tisca. During the travel the civilians saw Chetniks showed the three-finger symbol and when they arrived, Serb police forces forced them to surrender them to hand over gold and jewellery and threatening to chop off the women's breasts.

In 2008, The Bosnian newspaper Oslobođenje published a coverage of the arrest of Radovan Karadžić. On 24 July, the paper accusingly compared the leaders of Republic Srpska with those of the wartime era in the front paper depicting Milorad Dodik next to Karadžić with a photograph of Dodik giving the three-fingered salute during the war.

On 22 October 1999, Human Rights Watch obtained photographs from the KLA administration in Peć depicting Serb soldiers carrying assault rifle, doing the three-finger salute and standing in front of burning houses. KLA officials told the Human Rights Watch that the photographs had been found in the homes of ethnic Serb citizens in the Peć area after Serbian and Yugoslav forces withdrew from Kosovo on 12 June.

In 1999, after the NATO bombing of Serbia, Colin Woodard wrote about thousands of Serbian Americans who filled the park opposite the White House on Pennsylvania Avenue, shouting "Kosovo is Serbia" and "Stop the bombing", while wearing military caps and making the three-finger salute. Serb Orthodox priests at the gathering spoke to the crowd, stating that "Serbia was a civilised nation".

In 2001, after the end of the Kosovo war, the UCPMB forces were to hand over themselves to the KFOR, however, an incident occurred when Serb forces shot dead a UCPMB senior commander (who was not keen on the agreement with the KFOR) as he accidentally drove into a village where Serb generals led a parade giving the Serbian three fingered salute.

Rade Leskovac, president of a Serb minority party in Croatia, caused controversy in 2007 when election posters featuring him with the salute were posted around Vukovar.

See also 

 Schwurhand

References

External links

Fingers
Hand gestures
Salutes
Serbian culture
Serbian nationalism
National symbols of Serbia
Serbian Orthodox Church